Boudewijn Buckinx (born 28 March 1945, in Lommel) is a Belgian composer and writer on music.

Buckinx attended the Antwerp Conservatory, and from 1964 studied composition and serial music with Lucien Goethals in Ghent, where he also studied electronic music at the IPEM. In 1968 he attended Stockhausen's composition studio in Darmstadt and participated in the composition of Stockhausen's Musik für ein Haus, contributing a quintet for flute, oboe, bass clarinet, bassoon, and cello titled Atoom. However, his principal influences are Mauricio Kagel and John Cage. He also studied musicology at the Catholic University of Leuven, graduating in 1972 with a dissertation on Cage's Variations.

Writings
1994. De kleine pomo: of, de muziekgeschiedenis van het postmodernisme. Peer: Alamire. .
1999. (With Yves Knockaert). Muziek uit de voorbije eeuw. Peer: Alamire. .
2001. Aria van de diepe noot: verzamelde commentaren. Peer: Alamire. .

Compositions (selective list)
 Sløjd, for mixed media (1968)
 Piotr Lunaire, for narrator, one singer, and piano (1985)
 Ce qu’on entend dans la salle de concert, for orchestra (1987)
 In der buurt van Neptunus, for cello and piano (1987)
 1001 Sonatas, for violin and piano (1988)
 Symposion, for violin and string orchestra (1991)
 Nine Unfinished Symphonies (1992)
 Kahk Deelah, for solo violin (1994)
 Karoena de zeemeermin, chamber opera (1995)
 Concerto for Cello and Orchestra (1996)
 String Quartet no. 15 (2003)
 Embarkation for Uropia, for orchestra (2004)
 Renaissance Revisited, for piano (2006)
 Piano Quartet no. 3, for violin, viola, cello, and piano (2007)
 Piano Quartet no. 4, for violin, viola, cello, and piano (2008)

References

Cited sources

External links
 
 Composer Profile
 About Buckinx

20th-century classical composers
21st-century classical composers
Belgian classical composers
Belgian male classical composers
1945 births
Living people
People from Lommel
Pupils of Karlheinz Stockhausen
20th-century Belgian male musicians
21st-century male musicians